Amyna natalis, the ilima moth, is a moth of the family Noctuidae. It was first described by Francis Walker in 1858. It is widespread from tropical Asia into northern Australia. It is an introduced species in Hawaii, where it is found on Oahu.

Description
The wingspan of the male is 20 mm and of the female is 26 mm. Body dull brown. Forewings with indistinct sub-basal, antemedial, postmedial and sub-marginal single waved lines with a few grey scales on them. Reniform represented by a small spot. Abdomen and hindwings are fuscous. Abdomen with an indistinct postmedial line.

Ecology
Larvae have been recorded on Abutilon incanum, Sida cordifolia, Sida fallax, Sida rhombifolia and Waltheria americana. The caterpillars are green loopers.

Bioacoustics
Males have been observed producing a continuous ultrasonic song of high intensity (about 102 dB SPL measured at a distance of 10 cm). During song production the animals were perching on plants and moving their wings up and down quickly. Simultaneously, by twisting the wings it seems likely that a male-specific bubble in the forewing functions as a tymbal, resulting in sound production. The sound production may be associated with the release of a pheromone from putative scent-disseminating structures on the underside of the forewing tymbal.

References

External links
Sound recordings of Amyna natalis on BioAcoustica

Un Chant D'appel Amoureux': Acoustic Communication In Moths
Australian Faunal Directory

Eustrotiinae
Moths of Asia
Moths of Australia